The Naked Man is a 1923 British silent comedy film directed by Henry Edwards and starring Henry Edwards, Chrissie White and James Carew.

Plot
The heir to £500,000 must live for one month without assistance.

Cast
 Henry Edwards as Felix Delaney  
 Chrissie White as Ninette Monday  
 James Carew as Anthony Mapletoft  
 Maud Cressall as Evelyn Garland  
 E. Holman Clark as Alderman Twentyman 
 Frank Stanmore as Hopkins  
 Gwynne Herbert as Mrs. Garland  
 Henry Vibart as Mr. Janson  
 Eric Maturin as Adrian Redwood  
 Jean Cadell as Miss Linnett  
 Stephen Ewart as Mr. Garland

References

Bibliography
 Parish, James Robert. Film Actors Guide. Scarecrow Press, 1977.

External links

1923 films
British comedy films
British silent feature films
1923 comedy films
1920s English-language films
Films directed by Henry Edwards
British black-and-white films
Hepworth Pictures films
1920s British films
Silent comedy films
English-language comedy films